The 95th National Guard Higher Command, is a Hellenic Army mechanized infantry division responsible for the defence of the island of Rhodes in Dodecanese Islands.

Structure 
 95th National Guard Higher Command (95ή ΑΔΤΕ), based at Rhodes, Dodecanese
 HQ Company (ΛΣΤ/95 ΑΔΤΕ)
 395th National Guard Armored Battalion (395 ΕΑΡΜΕΘ)
 95th National Guard Armored Reconnaissance Battalion (95 ΕΑΝΕΘ)
 211th National Guard Mechanized Battalion (211 M/K ΤΕ)
 541st National Guard Mechanized Battalion (542 M/K ΤΕ)
 542nd National Guard Mechanized Battalion (542 M/K ΤΕ)
 294th National Guard Battalion (294 ΤΕ)
 124th National Guard Artillery Battalion (124 ΜΠΒ)
 126th National Guard Artillery Battalion (126 ΜΠΒ)
 95th Anti Aircraft Artillery Battalion (95 ΜΕΑ/ΑΠ)
 95th National Guard Engineer Battalion (95 ΤΜΧΕΘ)
 474th National Guard Signal Battalion (474 ΤΔΒΕΘ)
 95th National Guard Anti Τank Company (95 ΛΑΤΕΘ)
 95th National Guard Supply Battalion (95 ΤΥΛΠΕΘ)
 95th National Guard Support Battalion (95 ΤΕΜΕΘ)
 DAN of Tilos (ΔΑΝ Τηλου)
 DAN of Megisti (ΔΑΝ Μεγιστης)
 Rodos Home Guard Battalion (ΤΕ Ροδου)
 Ano Kalamonas Home Guard Battalion (ΤΕ Ανω Καλαμωνα)
 Κarpathos Home Guard Battalion (ΤΕ Καρπαθου)

Mechanized infantry brigades of Greece
Rhodes